Syd Shelton (born 1947) is a British photographer, living in Hove, who documented the Rock Against Racism movement. His work is held in the collections of Tate and the Victoria and Albert Museum.

Life and work
Shelton was born in Pontefract in 1947. Having studied fine art in Yorkshire he began his photography practice in the early 1970s, following a move to Australia. In Sydney, Shelton worked as a freelance photo-journalist for newspapers such as Nation Review, The Age, and Digger. In 1975 he had a solo exhibition of his photographs, Working Class Heroes at the Sydney Film-makers Cooperative.

In 1976, Shelton returned to London and established the design and photography partnership Red Wedge Graphics' which evolved into the current agency Graphicsi. Shelton become one of the key activists in the movement Rock Against Racism (RAR). He was a photographer and one of the designers of the RAR magazine 'Temporary hoarding' which was published between 1976 and 1981. During the 1980s, as well as producing photographs for magazines and the press, and graphics for the public and private sector, Shelton co-edited, and was art director of, a series of photographic books that includes Day in the Life of London, and Ireland: A Week in the Life of a Nation.

He now lives in Hove.

Publications

Books of work by Shelton
Rock Against Racism. London: Autograph ABP, 2016. . Co-edited by Mark Sealy and Carol Tulloch. With an essay by Paul Gilroy.
Syd Shelton, Red Saunders, Malcolm McGregor: A Day in the Life of London. Jonathan Cape Ltd, 1985, 288 pages, ISBN 978-0224029759.Syd Shelton, Red Saunders: Ireland: A Week in the Life of a Nation. Century Hutchinson, 1986, 288 pages, ISBN 9780712695183.
The Falls. Fistful of Books, 2022. Edited by Simon Robinson.

Zines of work by Shelton
Crowds 1977–1981. Southport: Café Royal, 2019. With a text by Tulloch. Edition of 250 copies. Later reprinted.
West Belfast 1979. Southport: Café Royal, 2020. Edited by Craig Atkinson.
Street Portraits. Southport: Café Royal, 2020. Edited by Atkinson.
The Battle of Lewisham 1977. Southport: Café Royal, 2021. Edited by Atkinson.
Street Portraits Two. Southport: Café Royal, 2021. Edited by Atkinson.
Rock Against Racism-Live. Southport: Café Royal, 2022. Edited by Atkinson.

Exhibitions

Solo exhibitions
Syd Shelton: Rock Against Racism, curated by Mark Sealy and Carol Tulloch, Autograph ABP, Rivington Place, London, 2015; Impressions Gallery, Bradford, 2016; Street Level Photoworks, Glasgow, 2017; Gallery Oldham, Oldham, 2020

Group exhibitions
Music Migrations (1962–1989), Cité nationale de l'histoire de l'immigration, Paris, 2019–2020
Facing Britain – British documentary photography since the 1960s, Museum Goch, Germany, 2020
Stan Firm inna Inglan: Black Diaspora in London, 1960–70s, 2016/2017, Tate Britain, London
The Vanishing East End: 1970–1980s, Tower Hamlets Local History Library and Archives 1 October 2021- 4 February 2022, London

Collections
Shelton's work is held in the following permanent collections:
Tate, UK: 7 prints (as of April 2020) 4 prints (as of August 2021)
Victoria and Albert Museum, London: 8 prints (as of April 2020)
National Portrait Gallery, London: 2 prints (as of September 2021)
Autograph ABP, London

References

External links

"Rock Against Racism: Syd Shelton's photographs of a movement in 1970s Britain", Katy Cowan, Creative Boom, 2017
"Punk and reggae fought back against racism in the 70s", Stuart Brumfitt, i-D, 2015

British photojournalists
20th-century British photographers
People from Pontefract
Living people
1947 births
Photographers from Yorkshire